Zun-Kholba (Züün Kholbo) is a rural locality (an ulus) in Okinsky District, Republic of Buryatia, Russia. The population was 29 as of 2010. There are 3 streets.

Geography 
Zun-Kholba is located 171 km southeast of Orlik (the district's administrative centre) by road. Samarta is the nearest rural locality.

References 

Rural localities in Okinsky District